Crow's Blood (stylized as CROW'S BLOOD) is a Japanese six-episode horror streaming television drama series with an original story concept written by Yasushi Akimoto and executive produced by Darren Lynn Bousman.

It stars Mayu Watanabe (at the time a member of AKB48), Sakura Miyawaki (at the time a member of HKT48), Takahiro Miura and Tetsuya Bessho, along with many other then-members of AKB48 Group in supporting roles, and the series was directed by Ryo Nishimura and written by Clint Sears  and additional screenplay cooperation by Satoshi Oshio.
 Episodes also feature cameo appearances by performers including Lily Franky and Shota Sometani. It was marketed in Japan with the slogan "Yasushi Akimoto × Hollywood × AKB48", reflecting the collaboration between Akimoto (noted as both a writer of horror and founder of AKB48 Group), lead staff drawn from the United States of American film and television industry, and members of AKB48 Group.

The first episode premiered on Nippon TV in Japan on July 23, 2016, while all six episodes were released for streaming on Hulu Japan the same day.

In December 2016, Miramax acquired the worldwide sales rights for the series, excluding Japan. The series made its English-language debut in the United States on El Rey Network, which aired all six episodes on October 28, 2017.

In the United Kingdom, the series has been licensed by Channel Four Television Corporation. The first episode was broadcast on Film4 on Wednesday 31 October 2018 and all six episodes were released for advertising-supported streaming on All 4 the same day. Unlike in the United States, in both instances the episodes have only been made available in Japanese with English subtitles.

Plot
Soon after, a series of strange and horrific events occur in and around the school, seemingly in the proximity of or due to new student Maki. Another student, named Kaoru Isozaki, finds herself learning that Maki was initially killed in a hit and run and was dead until later revived by her own father, Dr. Akihito Seto, with an experimental regenerative procedure developed by an American scientist. Unfortunately, Dr. Seto learned too late of the side effects on Maki's psyche and cellular tissue, turning her into the patient zero of a new contagious virus, easily transmitted via kissing, which renders females able to regenerate indefinitely, however with some rather horrific side effects.

Cast
 Mayu Watanabe as Kaoru Isozaki
 Sakura Miyawaki as Maki Togawa
 Yuki Kashiwagi as Mai Utsui
 Anna Iriyama as Aoi Nojiri
 Yuria Kizaki as Hikari Yanaka
 Rena Kato as Keiko Yodogawa
 Mion Mukaichi as Nami Katayama
 Yui Yokoyama as Chisa Furugōri
 Jurina Matsui as Shinobu Matsumura
 Tetsuya Bessho as Doctor Akihito Seto
 Chris Glover as Doctor Gary Grossman
 Takahiro Miura as Takeshi Sawada
 Tomoharu Hasegawa as Kōji Ogasawara
 Tomohiro Kaku as Yoshio Tachibana
 Lily Franky as The Undertaker (cameo)
 Mitsu Dan as Eiko Yoshikawa
 Maiko as Chizuru Tamura
 Shota Sometani as Man in Wheelchair (cameo)
 Katsuya as Detective Shigeo Takuma (cameo)

Dub Voice Cast
 Xanthe Huynh as Kaoru Isozaki
 Cristina Vee as Maki Togawa
 Derek Stephen Prince as Takeshi Sawada
 Richard Epcar as Doctor Gary Grossman
 David Vincent as Kōji Ogasawara
 Todd Haberkorn as Yoshio Tachibana
 Stephanie Sheh as Chizuru Tamura 
 Bryce Papenbrook as Man in Wheelchair
 Michael Sorich as Detective Shigeo Takuma

References

External links
  
 

Hulu Japan original programming
2016 Japanese television series debuts
AKB48
Channel 4 miniseries
Channel 4 television dramas
Japanese horror fiction television series
Japanese television miniseries
2010s school television series
Television series by Miramax Television
Thriller television series